Trogloconcha lamellinodosa is a species of sea snail, a marine gastropod mollusk or micromollusk in the family Larocheidae.

References

External links
 To World Register of Marine Species

Larocheidae